"Arrows" is a song by American indie rock artist Fences, pen name of singer Christopher Mansfield. The song features American hip hop duo Macklemore & Ryan Lewis. It was released on July 29, 2014, coinciding with Mansfield's announcement of the release of the debut Fences studio album Lesser Oceans on January 13, 2015. The single topped Billboard magazine's Emerging Artists chart and has also peaked at number 33 in Australia.

Music video
The song's music video was directed by Jason Koenig and John Keatley and produced by StraightEIGHT Films, based on a concept written and created by Koenig with Macklemore & Ryan Lewis and Chris Mansfield.

Track listing
Digital download
 "Arrows"  – 3:55

CD single (Germany)
 "Arrows"  – 3:55
 "Brass Band" – 3:29

Charts

Release history

References

2014 singles
2014 songs
Macklemore songs
Ryan Lewis songs
Songs written by Macklemore
Songs written by Ryan Lewis